Pavel Vyacheslavovich Gusterin (Russian: Павел Вячеславович Густерин; born  April 16, 1972) is a Russian orientalist.

Education 

Pavel Gusterin is a graduate of the Tver State University (Department of History; 1994), the Institute of Asian and African Countries at the Moscow State University named after Mikhail Vasilyevich Lomonosov (Department of Arab Studies; 2001), and the Diplomatic Academy of the Ministry of Foreign Affairs of the Russian Federation (Department of International relations; 2011).

Biography 

Pavel Gusterin was born on 16 April 1972 in Kimry, the Tver region, Russia.

In 2001—2003, he was an editor of the Publishing house «Восточная литература» (“Oriental Literature”) at the Russian Academy of Sciences.

After returning from his business trip to Yemen (2003—2005) he published a number of articles in the journals «Азия и Африка сегодня» (“Asia and Africa Today”), «Вопросы истории» (“Historical Issues”), «Высшее образование сегодня» (“Higher Education Today”), «Дипломатическая служба» (“Diplomatic Service”), «Исламоведение» (“Islamic Studies”), «Мир музея» (“World of Museum”), «Новая и новейшая история» (“New and Contemporary History”), «Православный Палестинский сборник» (“Orthodox Palestine Collection”), “Al-Moutawasset”, etc., as well as the reference book «Йеменская Республика и её города» (“Republic of Yemen and Its Towns”, Moscow, 2006),  the encyclopaedic reference book «Города Арабского Востока» (“Towns of Arab East”, Moscow, 2007), and collection of essays "Первый российский востоковед Дмитрий Кантемир / First Russian Orientalist Dmitry Kantemir" (Moscow, 2008), etc.

In 2006—2013, he was a researcher of the Centre for Arab and Islamic Studies of the Institute of Oriental Studies of the Russian Academy of Sciences.

Since 2013, he is a researcher of the Centre for Asian and Middle-East Studies of the Russian Institute for Strategic Studies.

Selected bibliography 

 Йеменская республика и её города. М., 2006. 
 Города Арабского Востока. М., 2007. 
 Первый российский востоковед Дмитрий Кантемир / First Russian Orientalist Dmitry Kantemir. М., 2008. 
 Советская разведка на Ближнем и Среднем Востоке в 1920—30-х годах. Саарбрюккен, 2014. 
The Middle East: Past and Present. Part 1. Saarbrücken, 2015.

References 

 About the Author. — In: P. V. Gusterin. First Russian Orientalist Dmitry Kantemir. Moscow, 2008, p. 110.

1972 births
Living people
Academic staff of Moscow State University
Moscow State University alumni
Historians of the Middle East
Russian Arabists
Diplomatic Academy of the Ministry of Foreign Affairs of the Russian Federation alumni
Scholars of Islam
Russian orientalists
21st-century Russian historians
Russian historians of espionage
Tver State University alumni